Friar's Balsam (1885–1899) was an English Thoroughbred racehorse. He was the outstanding British two-year-old of 1887, when he was unbeaten in seven races. He was a sick horse when a beaten favourite in the following year's 2000 Guineas, but returned in the autumn to beat Minting in the Champion Stakes. Friar's Balsam was retired to stud where he had some success as a sire of winners. He was trained at Kingsclere by John Porter for Lord Alington and Sir Frederick Johnstone.

Breeding
Friar's Balsam was a chestnut colt foaled in 1885. His conformation was not perfect, as he was described as being "very much over at the knee". Friar's Balsam's sire was The Derby winner Hermit. His dam, Flower of Dorset, was sired by Breadalbane out of the Park Hill Stakes winner Imperatrice, the founder of Thoroughbred family 2-k.

Racing career

1887: two-year-old season
Friar's Balsam began his racing career in the New Stakes at Ascot. In a field of seven that included Seabreeze and Ayrshire he won easily. After this race his owners Alington and Johnston refused an offer of £10,000 for him. He followed the New Stakes up with a win in the Hurstborne Stakes at Stockbridge. His next start came in the July Stakes, where he beat Seabreeze by ¾ length. His registered his fourth successive win in the Richmond Stakes at Goodwood, carrying a ten-pound weight penalty. At the same meeting he also won the Molecombe Stakes in a walkover. After a break won the Middle Park Plate beating a field that again included Seabreeze. His seventh and final start of the season came in the Dewhurst Plate, where he won carrying a ten-pound penalty.

1888: three-year-old season
Friar's Balsam had been the favourite for the 2000 Guineas and Epsom Derby throughout the winter and spring. A small field of six went to post for the 2000 Guineas. Ridden by Tom Cannon, Friar's Balsam was the 1/3 favourite, Ayrshire was at 100/12 and Orbit was 100/8. Friar's Balsam began near the rear, but he never came to the front and was in trouble a long way from the finish. He eventually finished fifth, with Ayshire winning easily by two lengths. He had looked beaten only a quarter of a mile into the race and it was later found that an abscess in his mouth had burst in the opening stages. He was then taken out of the Derby.

His first race back after the 2000 Guineas was the Lancashire Plate, where he finished unplaced and the race was won by Seabreeze. He started the Champion Stakes at Newmarket in a field that included Minting. Minting started favourite the 60/100 favourite, with Friar's Balsam at 5/2. After the start he settled in third place of the six runners. In the closing stages Friar's Balsam and Minting drew rapidly clear of the others before they had even been asked for an effort. With Friar's Balsam in a slight lead Minting tried to close, but could not and Friar's Balsam beat him by half a length without being extended, the two being well clear of the rest.

1889: four-year-old season
At the end of the 1888 season Friar's Balsam underwent an operation. His only run as a four-year-old was in the Royal Stakes at Kempton Park, where he finished unplaced behind Ayrshire.

Stud record
At stud Friar's Balsam sired Balsamo who won the valuable City and Suburban Handicap. He also sired Mother Siegel who was the dam of 2000 Guineas and Epsom Derby winner Minoru. Another of his daughters, Grand Marnier, was the grandam of the Derby winner Grand Parade. Friar's Balsam's son Voter became a leading racehorse in North America, winning the Metropolitan Handicap. Voter in turn sired Ballot, who was rated the best older horse in America in 1908 and 1910. Friar's Balsam died in 1899 at the age of fourteen.

Pedigree

Note: b. = Bay, br. = Brown, ch. = Chestnut

* Friar's Balsam was inbred 3x4 to Touchstone. This means that the stallion appears once in the third generation and once in the fourth generation of his pedigree.

References

1885 racehorse births
1899 racehorse deaths
Racehorses bred in the United Kingdom
Racehorses trained in the United Kingdom
Thoroughbred family 2-k